Events from the year 1560 in France.

Incumbents
Monarchs: Francis II (until December 5), then Charles IX

Events
 
 
 
 
 
 
 March 17 – Leaders of the Amboise conspiracy, including Godefroy de Barry, seigneur de La Renaudie, make an unsuccessful attempt to storm the château of Amboise, where the young French king and queen are residing.  La Renaudie is subsequently caught and executed, along with over a thousand of his followers.
 July 6 – The Treaty of Edinburgh is signed between England, France and Scotland.  The French withdraw from Scotland.  This largely ends the Auld Alliance between France and Scotland, and ends the wars between England and its northern neighbour.
 December 5 – Seventeen-year-old Mary, Queen of Scots, is widowed by the death of her first husband, King Francis II of France.  Her mother-in-law, Catherine de' Medici, becomes regent of France.
 December 6 – Charles IX of France succeeds his elder brother, Francis II, at the age of ten.

Births
 

 
 December 13 – Maximilien de Béthune, Duke of Sully, French duke (d. 1641)

Deaths
 

 
 January 1 – Joachim du Bellay, French poet (b. c. 1522)
 February 16 – Jean du Bellay, French cardinal and diplomat (b. c. 1493)

See also

References

1560s in France